Florence Kopleff (May 2, 1924 – July 24, 2012)  was an American contralto.

She was born in New York City, and died in Atlanta, GA of complications of diabetes.

She began her career in 1941 when she was in her senior year of high school. In 1954 the New York Times termed her performance at New York's Town Hall "a debut recital of considerable distinction," and further stated that "Her voice is a large, powerful instrument with a wonderful ringing sonority, evenly produced over a wide range."  She was very active as a concert and oratorio singer, appearing and recording with many of the great conductors of her era, particularly as a soloist with the Robert Shaw Chorale. She was also a frequent soloist with the Atlanta Symphony Orchestra, of which Robert Shaw was the conductor. Time magazine once called her the "greatest living alto."

She taught at Georgia State University starting in 1968, when she became a professor and the school's first artist-in-residence. The GSU School of Music's recital hall is named for her.

Sources

This article is based on interviews with Florence Kopleff.

Recordings
Bach: Mass in B minor with Robert Shaw, RCA Victor, Grammy winner, 1961
Beethoven: 9th Symphony with Fritz Reiner, RCA Victor
Berlioz: L'Enfance du Christ, with Charles Münch, RCA Victor (now available in a multi-album reissue set Munch Conducts Berlioz) A 1966 video of a live performance, also conducted by Munch, has been issued as Video Artists Int'l DVD, Catalog #4303.
Mahler: Symphony No. 2 with Maurice Abravanel, Vanguard
Handel: Messiah with Robert Shaw, RCA Victor, Grammy winner, 1967
[Handel] Israel in Egypt (oratorio), with Musica Aeterna, cond. Frederic Waldman

References

Biography on Bach Cantata Web site

American women singers
Operatic contraltos
1924 births
2012 deaths
21st-century American women